People's Democratic Front or Popular Democratic Front can refer to:
People's Democratic Front (Burma)
People's Democratic Front (Hyderabad)
People's Democratic Front (Indonesia)
People's Democratic Front (Iran)
People's Democratic Front (Meghalaya)
People's Democratic Front (Romania)
Popular Democratic Front (Italy)